Rehman Sobhan (born 12 March 1935) is a Bangladeshi economist. Regarded as one of the country's top public thinkers, he is the founder of the Centre for Policy Dialogue. Sobhan is an icon of the Bangladeshi independence movement due to his role as a spokesman of the Provisional Government of Bangladesh in the United States during the Bangladesh Liberation War. He was awarded the Independence Day Award, Bangladesh's highest civilian honour, in 2008.

Education and career

Sobhan's father, Khondker Fazle Sobhan, was a graduate of Presidency College, Kolkata and one of the first Muslims to qualify to attend Royal Military Academy Sandhurst. Later he rose to become a ranked officer in the Indian Police Service. Sobhan's mother, Hashmat Ara Begum, was a niece of Sir Khawaja Nazimuddin, the Governor General of Pakistan during 1948–51 and Prime Minister of Pakistan during 1951–53. Sobhan went to St. Paul's School, Darjeeling at the age of seven and completed his Senior Cambridge examination in 1950. He then attended Aitchison College in Lahore for two years. He went on to Cambridge University to earn his bachelor's degree.  In late 1966, Sobhan went to the LSE for his graduate studies but returned, without completing his degree,  to Dhaka in March 1969 after the fall of the Ayub regime.

After completing his undergraduate degree at Cambridge, Sobhan moved to Dhaka in January 1957. He joined as a faculty member of the department of economics at the University of Dhaka in October and served until 1971.  In a seminar in 1961, he made a remark on the economic disparities between West and East Pakistan saying "Pakistan consisted of two economies". It made the headlines on the Pakistan Observer and the then President of Pakistan Ayub Khan expressed the opposite point of view.

After the liberation of Bangladesh in 1971, Sobhan was appointed a member of the Planning Commission. He quit when he, along with others, fell from the grace of Sheikh Mujib in 1975. Later he worked as the director-general of Bangladesh Institute of Development Studies. Between 1976 and 1979, he was a visiting fellow at Queen Elizabeth House, University of Oxford. After retirement from BIDS, he set up Centre for Policy Dialogue in 1993, a high-profile private sector think-tank, where he works as its Executive Chairman.

Pre-independence contributions
In the 1960s, Sobhan, with a number of other nationalist economists under the intellectual leadership of Nurul Islam, contributed to the drafting of the six-points programme that became the basis for the struggle for autonomy in the then East Pakistan. The writings of this group of economists on the regional disparity between West Pakistan (Pakistan since 1971) and East Pakistan (Bangladesh since 1971) played an important role in fomenting nationalist aspirations of the people of Bangladesh. During the liberation war (from 26 March to 16 December 1971), he was a roving ambassador for Bangladesh and lobbied in the United States.

Post-independence activities
After the independence of Bangladesh, Sobhan became one of Sheikh Mujibur Rahman's four members of the Planning Commission. He left the country after he was asked to quit. Upon his return to Bangladesh in 1982, he joined Bangladesh Institute of Development Studies (BIDS) and later he founded the Centre for Policy Dialogue (CPD). Currently he is the chairman of CPD, which is active in open public discussions of policy issues, particularly in the area of governance. He was appointed an advisor of the Caretaker Government in Bangladesh in 1990–91.

Family
Sobhan married Salma Sobhan in 1962. She was the first woman barrister in Pakistan, an academic and a human rights activist. After her death in 2003, he then married Rounaq Jahan, a political scientist and a Distinguished Fellow at CPD. Sobhan's younger brother, Farooq Sobhan, is a former diplomat and the current President of Bangladesh Enterprise Institute, a private-sector think-tank of Bangladesh. His son Zafar Sobhan is the editor of the English daily Dhaka Tribune published from Dhaka.

Selected bibliography

Books

Chapters in books

Journal articles

See also
 List of Bangladeshi people#Economists

References

1935 births
Living people
St. Paul's School, Darjeeling alumni
Aitchison College alumni
Alumni of the University of Cambridge
Academic staff of the University of Dhaka
Bangladeshi economists
Advisors of Caretaker Government of Bangladesh
Honorary Fellows of Bangla Academy
Recipients of the Independence Day Award
Members of the Dhaka Nawab family
20th-century Bengalis
21st-century Bengalis
Urdu-speaking Bangladeshi
Scientists from West Bengal